Arms of alliance are those coat of arms that families or private persons take up and join to their own to denote the alliances they have contracted by marriage. In England arms of alliance are used exclusively by royalty, with non-royal / commoner armigers impaling the arms of both parties within a single shield.

See also
Heraldic courtesy

References

Attribution

Heraldry